Heimfeld  is a station on the Harburg S-Bahn line in Hamburg, Germany, and served by the trains of Hamburg S-Bahn lines S3 and S31. The station was opened in 1984 and is located in the Hamburg district of Heimfeld. Heimfeld is part of the Hamburg borough of Harburg.

History  
The station was opened with the S3's extension to Neugraben in 1984. Renovations started in 2012. Tiles removed in 2018. Walls painted black in 2019. Ceiling cover for electrical wires removed in 2015. Escalator removed in 2022. New LCD platform displays installed in late 2022. Still waiting for new ceiling and walls in 2022.

Service 
The lines S3 and S31 of Hamburg S-Bahn call at Heimfeld station.

Gallery

See also  

 Hamburger Verkehrsverbund (HVV)
 List of Hamburg S-Bahn stations

References

External links 

 Line and route network plans at hvv.de 

Hamburg S-Bahn stations in Hamburg
Buildings and structures in Harburg, Hamburg
Hamburg Heimfeld
Hamburg Heimfeld
Railway stations located underground in Hamburg